Manzur Quader is a Bangladeshi politician, retired major of Bangladesh Army, former minister of state and the former Member of Parliament of Pabna-1 and Sirajganj-6.

Career
Quader was elected to parliament from Pabna-1 as a Jatiya Party candidate in 1986 and 1988. He was elected a member of parliament from Pabna-1 as a Bangladesh Nationalist Party candidate in February 1996 Bangladeshi general election.

He was the Minister of State for Water Development from 3 March 1986 to 4 December 1990.

He was elected a member of parliament from Sirajganj-6 as a Bangladesh Nationalist Party candidate in 2001 Bangladeshi general election.

He was defeated by participating in the national elections of the 1991 Bangladeshi general election from Pabna-1 as a Jatiya Party candidate.

He was defeated by participating in the national elections of the 12 June 1996  Bangladeshi general election from Pabna-1 as a Bangladesh Nationalist Party candidate and 2008 Bangladeshi general election from Sirajganj-6 as a Bangladesh Nationalist Party candidate.

In June 2008, Quader was accused by the Bangladesh Anti-Corruption Commission of non distribution of 934 pieces of CI sheet which was meant for distribution among the distress people under the government relief programs. He was accused alongside 11 others in Sirajganj court. The case was however, stayed by the High Court and 50 persons who received the CI sheets filed civil suit praying for permanent injunction so that the aithority cannot remove CI sheets from their respective shops. The Court passed judgment, order and deree in  2010 in favour of the receivers of the CI sheets 
and as such the case filed by the ACC  became totally ineffective and infractuous.

References

Living people
Jatiya Party politicians
Bangladesh Nationalist Party politicians
3rd Jatiya Sangsad members
4th Jatiya Sangsad members
6th Jatiya Sangsad members
8th Jatiya Sangsad members
People from Pabna District
People from Sirajganj District
Year of birth missing (living people)
Bangladeshi military personnel